This articles covers the history of Italy as a monarchy and in the World Wars.

Italian unification (1738–1870)

Modern Italy became a nation-state during the Risorgimento on March 17, 1861, when most of the states of the Italian Peninsula and the Kingdom of the Two Sicilies were united under king Victor Emmanuel II of the House of Savoy, hitherto king of Sardinia, a realm that included Piedmont.

Giuseppe Garibaldi (July 4, 1807 – June 2, 1882) was an Italian patriot and soldier of the Risorgimento.  He personally led many of the military campaigns that brought about the formation of a unified Italy.  He has been dubbed the "Hero of the Two Worlds" in tribute to his military expeditions in South America and Europe.

The architect of Italian unification was Count Camillo Benso di Cavour, the Chief Minister of Victor Emmanuel.
Rome itself remained for a decade under the Papacy, and became part of the Kingdom of Italy only in 1870, the final date of Italian unification.

Napoleon III's defeat brought an end to the French military protection for Pope Pius IX and on September 20 Italian troops breached Rome's walls at Porta Pia and entered the city.  The Italian occupation forced Pius IX to his palace where he declared himself a prisoner in the Vatican until the Lateran Pacts of 1929.

The Holy See (State of the Vatican City) since 1929 has been an independent enclave surrounded by Rome, Italy.

From the unification to the First World War (1870–1914)
From its beginning, the Italian Nationalist Movement had dreamed about Italy joining the modernized World Powers. In the North, extensive industrialization and the building of a modern infrastructure was well underway by the 1890s. Alpine railway lines connected Italy to the French, German and Austrian rail systems. Two south-going coastal lines were also completed. Most of the larger industrial businesses were founded with considerable investment from Germany, Britain, France and others. Subsequently, the Italian state decided to help initiate heavy industry such as car factories, steel works and ship building, adopting a protectionist trade policy from the 1880s onward. Northern Italian agriculture was modernized, as well, bringing larger profits, underpinned by powerful co-operatives. The South, however, did not experience the same kind of development in any of the above-mentioned areas.

Liberal period

After unification, Italy's politics favored radical socialism due to a regionally fragmented right, as conservative Prime Minister Marco Minghetti only held on to power by enacting revolutionary and socialist-leaning policies to appease the opposition, such as the nationalization of railways. In 1876, Minghetti was ousted and replaced by Agostino Depretis, a moderate liberal. Depretis began his term as Prime Minister by initiating an experimental political idea called Trasformismo (transformism). The theory of Trasformismo was that a cabinet should select a variety of moderates and capable politicians from a non-partisan perspective. In practice, trasformismo was authoritarian and corrupt; Depretis pressured districts to vote for his candidates if they wished to gain favourable concessions from Depretis when in power. In the 1876 election, only four representatives from the right were elected, allowing the vrag to be dominated by Depretis. Despotic and corrupt actions  are believed to be the key means in which Depretis managed to keep support in southern Italy.  He put through authoritarian measures, such as banning public meetings, placing "dangerous" individuals in internal exile on remote penal islands across Italy and adopting militarist policies. Depretis enacted controversial legislation for the time, such was abolishing arrest for debt, making elementary education free and compulsory while ending compulsory religious teaching in elementary schools.

Crispi
In 1887, Depretis cabinet minister and former Garibaldi republican Francesco Crispi became Prime Minister. Crispi's major concerns during his term of office was protecting Italy from its dangerous neighbour Austria-Hungary. To meet that threat, Crispi worked to build Italy as a great world power through increased military expenditure, expansionism, and trying to win Germany's favor by joining the Triple Alliance, which included both Germany and Austria-Hungary in 1882.  While helping Italy develop strategically, he continued trasformismo and was authoritarian, once suggesting the use of martial law to ban opposition parties. Despite being authoritarian, Crispi put through liberal policies such as the Public Health Act of 1888 and establishing tribunals for redress against abuses by the government.

The overwhelming attention paid to foreign policy alienated the agricultural elements, whose power had been in decline since 1873. Both radical and conservative forces in the Italian parliament demanded that the government investigate how to improve agriculture in Italy. The investigation, which started in 1877 and was published eight years later, showed that agriculture was not improving, that landowners were swallowing up revenue from their lands and contributing almost nothing to the development of the land. There was opposition by lower class Italians to the break-up of communal lands that benefited only landlords. Most of the workers on the agricultural lands were not peasants but short-term labourers who at best were employed for one year. Peasants without stable income were forced to live off meagre food supplies, disease was spreading rapidly and plagues were reported, including a major cholera epidemic which killed at least 65,000 people.

The Italian government could not deal with the situation effectively due to the mass overspending of the Depretis government that left Italy in huge debt. Italy also suffered economically because of an overproduction of grapes for their vineyards in the 1870s and 1880s when France's vineyard industry was suffering from vine disease caused by insects. Italy during that time prospered as the largest exporter of wine in Europe, but following the recovery of France in 1888, southern Italy was overproducing and had to cut back, which caused unemployment and bankruptcies.

Early colonialism

In the late 19th and early 20th century, Italy attempted to join the Great Powers in acquiring colonies, though it found this difficult due to resistance and unprofitable due to heavy military costs and the lesser economic value of spheres of influence remaining when Italy began to colonize.

A number of colonial projects were undertaken by the government. These were done to gain support of Italian nationalists and imperialists, who wanted to rebuild a Roman Empire. Already, there were large Italian communities in Alexandria, Cairo, and Tunis. Italy first attempted to gain colonies by entering a variety of failed negotiations with other world powers to make colonial concessions. Another approach by Italy was to investigate uncolonized, undeveloped lands by sending missionaries to them. The most promising and realistic lands for colonization were parts of Africa. Italian missionaries had already established a foothold at Massawa in the 1830s and had entered deep into Ethiopia.

During the construction of the Suez Canal in Egypt by Britain and France in the 1850s, Cavour believed that this presented an opportunity for Italian access to the East and had wanted the Italian merchant marine to take advantage of the Suez Canal's creation. Following Cavour's initiative, a man named Sapeto was given permission by the Rubattino shipping company to use a ship to establish a station in east Africa as a means of creating a route to the east. Sapeto landed at the Bay of Assab, a part of modern-day Eritrea in 1869. One year later, the land was purchased from the local Sultan by the Rubattino shipping company acting on the behalf of the Italian government. In 1882, Assab officially became an Italian territory, making it Italy's first colony. Though Tunisia would have been a preferable target because of its close proximity to Italy, the threat of reaction by the French made the attempt too dangerous to pursue. Italy could not afford the threat of war, as its industry was not developed. Assab stood as the start of the small colonial adventures that Italy would initially undertake.

On 5 February 1885, taking advantage of Egypt's conflict with Britain, Italian soldiers landed at Massawa in present-day Eritrea, shortly after the fall of Egyptian rule in Khartoum. As was key in Italian foreign policy, the British backed Italy's taking of Massawa from the Egyptians as it aided their occupation efforts.  In 1888, Italy annexed Massawa by force, allowing it to pursue its creation of the colony of Italian Eritrea.

In 1885, Italy offered Britain military support for the occupation of Egyptian Sudan, but the British decided that they did not need Italian support to crush the remainder of Egypt, as the forces of Sudanese Muslim rebel Muhammad Ahmad, called the Mahdist army in Sudan, already had crushed remaining Egyptian forces, and Ethiopia's (then called Abyssinia) intervention in Sudan also aided the British. Italy's earlier intervention in Assab set off tensions with Ethiopia, which had territorial aims on Assab, and Italy's official annexation of Ethiopian-claimed Massawa in 1888 increased tensions further.

In 1889, Ethiopia's Emperor Yohannes IV died in battle in Sudan, Menelik II replaced Yohannes as Emperor. Menelik believed he could negotiate with Italy to avoid war and in error allowed Italy's claim to Massawa. Menelik made another serious blunder when he signed an agreement which declared that Ethiopia would work alongside the King of Italy in its dealings with foreign powers, which the Italians interpreted to declare that Ethiopia had in effect made itself a protectorate of Italy. Menelik opposed the Italian interpretation and the differences between the two states grew.

In October 1889, Menelik met with a Russian officer who was sent to discuss merging the Russian and Abyssinian orthodox churches, but Menelik was more concerned over Italy's massing army in Eritrea. The meeting was used by Menelik to show unity between Ethiopia and Russia against Italian interests in the area.

Russia's own interests in East Africa led Russia's government to send large amounts of modern weaponry to the Ethiopians to hold back an Italian invasion. In response, Britain decided to back the Italians to challenge Russian influence in Africa and declared that all of Ethiopia was within the sphere of Italian interest. On the verge of war, Italian militarism and nationalism reached a peak, with Italians flocking to the Italian army, hoping to take part in the upcoming war.

In 1895, Ethiopia abandoned its agreement to follow Italian foreign policy, and Italy used the renunciation as a reason to invade Ethiopia, with the support of the United Kingdom. The Italian and British army failed on the battlefield of Adowa, as the Ethiopians were numerical superior and supported by Russia and France with modern weapons; the sheer large numbers of the Ethiopian warriors forced Italy eventually to retreat into Eritrea. Ethiopia would remain independent from Italy and other colonial powers until it was occupied in 1936 but then subsequently liberated after World War II.

Giovanni Giolitti

In 1892, Giovanni Giolitti became Prime Minister of Italy for his first term. Though his first government quickly collapsed a year later, Giolitti returned in 1903 to lead Italy's government during a fragmented reign that lasted until 1914. Giolitti had spent his earlier life as a civil servant, and then took positions within the cabinets of Crispi. Giolitti was the first long-term Italian Prime Minister in many years and was so because he mastered the political concept of trasformismo by manipulating, coercing and bribing officials to his side. In elections during Giolitti's government, voting fraud was common, and Giolitti helped improve voting only in well-off, more supportive areas, while attempting to isolate and intimidate poor areas where opposition was strong.

On May 5, 1898, workers in Milan organized a strike to demonstrate against the government of Antonio Starrabba di Rudinì, holding it responsible for the general increase of prices and for the famine that was affecting the country. In response infantry, cavalry and artillery were brought into the city and General Fiorenzo Bava Beccaris ordered his troops to fire on demonstrators. According to the government, there were 118 dead and 450 wounded. King Umberto I praised the General and awarded him the medal of Grande Ufficiale dell'Ordine Militare dei Savoia. The decoration exacerbated the Italian population's indignation. On the other hand, Antonio di Rudinì was forced to resign in July 1898.

On 29 July 1900, at Monza, Umberto I was assassinated by the anarchist Gaetano Bresci who claimed he had come directly from America to avenge the victims of the repression, and the offense given by the decoration awarded to General Bava Beccaris.

Southern Italy was in terrible shape prior to and during Giolitti's tenure as Prime Minister. Four-fifths of southern Italians were illiterate and the dire situation there ranged from problems of large numbers of absentee landlords to rebellion and even starvation. Corruption was such a large problem that Giolitti himself admitted that there were places "where the law does not operate at all". Natural disasters like earthquakes and landslides were a common source of destruction in southern Italy, often killing hundreds of people in each disaster, and southern Italy's poverty made repair work very difficult to do. Giolitti's small response to the major earthquake in Messina in 1908 was blamed for the high number of deaths which numbered at 50,000 people. The Messina earthquake infuriated southern Italians who claimed that Giolitti favoured the rich north over them.  One study released in 1910 examined tax rates in north, central and southern Italy indicated that northern Italy with 48% of the nation's wealth paid 40% of the nation's taxes, while the south with 27% of the nation's wealth paid 32% of the nation's taxes.

Political upheavals

Politics were in turmoil. The expansion of the electorate from 3 million to 8.5 million voters in 1912 brought in many workers and peasants, with gains for the Socialist and Catholic forces.  New interest groups became better organized, with local organizations and influential newspapers, such as the Catholics, the nationalists, the farmers and the sugar growers. Giolitti lost his once-powerful hold on the press. During Giolitti's three-year absence, the Italian liberal establishment weakened with the rise of Italian nationalism. The nationalists were becoming a popular movement with popular leadership figures such as Enrico Corradini and the revolutionary Gabriele D'Annunzio. Nationalists began demanding the return of Italian-populated territories in Austria, demanded Croatian-populated Dalmatia, spoke of the need for Italy to expand territorially into Africa, particularly Libya. Giolitti negotiated with the nationalists demands and began planning an invasion of Ottoman Turkish-held Libya.

The Italian Catholic Electoral Union (Unione elettorale cattolica italiana) was formed in 1905 to coordinate Catholic voters. It was formed in 1905 after the suppression of the Opera dei Congressi following the encyclical Il fermo proposito of Pope Pius X.  The Union was headed in 1909–16 by Count Ottorino Gentiloni. The Gentiloni pact of 1913 brought many new Catholic voters into politics, where they supported the Liberal party of Prime Minister Giovanni Giolitti. By the terms of the pact, the Union directed Catholic voters to Giolitti supporters who agreed to favor the Church's position on such key issues as funding private Catholic schools, and blocking a law allowing divorce.

However the Socialists divided over Italy's conquest of Libya in 1911–12. Meanwhile, the nationalists grew in power. The Gentiloni pact brought new Catholic support to the Liberals, who were thus moving to more conservative positions. Increasingly the Radicals and Socialists on the Left rejected Giolitti, especially his pro-Catholic policies. In October 1913 he formed a new government with the clericals. Giolitti stepped down and the new government was headed by Antonio Salandra, a right-wing conservative.

Until 1922, Italy was a constitutional monarchy with a parliament; in 1913, the first universal male suffrage election was held.  The so-called Statuto Albertino, which Carlo Alberto conceded in 1848 remained unchanged, even if the kings usually abstained from abusing their extremely large powers (for example, senators were not elected but chosen by the king).

Colonial empire

In 1911, Giolitti's government agreed to sending forces to occupy Libya. Italy declared war on the Ottoman Empire which held Libya as a colony. The war ended only a year later, but the occupation resulted in acts of extreme discrimination towards Libyans such as the forced deportation of Libyans to the Tremiti Islands in October 1911 and by 1912, a third of these Libyan refugees had died due to lack of food supplies and shelter from the Italian occupation forces. Italian control of the area was weak, leading to twenty years of conflict with the Senussi religious order which was the main political and religious authority in the Libyan hinterlands. The invasion of Libya did mark a turn in direction for the opposition to the Italian government, revolutionaries became divided, some adopting nationalist lines, while others retaining socialist lines. The annexation of Libya caused nationalists to advocate Italy's domination of the Mediterranean Sea by occupying Greece as well as the Adriatic coastal region of Dalmatia.

While the success of the Libyan War improved the status of the nationalists, it did not help Giolitti's administration as a whole. The war radicalized the Italian Socialist Party with anti-war revolutionaries led by future-Fascist dictator Benito Mussolini calling for violence to bring down the government. Giolitti could no longer rely on the dwindling reformist socialist elements and was forced to concede even further to the right, Giolitti dropped all anticlericalism and reached out to clericals which alienated his moderate liberal base leaving him with an unsteady coalition which collapsed in 1914. By the end of his tenure, Italians detested him and the liberal establishment for the fraudulent elections, the divided society, and the failure and corruption of trasformiso organized governments. Giolitti would return as Prime Minister only briefly in 1920, but the era of liberalism was effectively over in Italy.

Italian colonial ventures began with the acquisition of the ports of Asseb in 1869 and Massawa in 1885 in what is now Eritrea.  These areas were claimed by Ethiopia at the time, and when Ethiopia went into turmoil at the death of Emperor Yohannes IV Italy moved into the northern Ethiopian highlands.  However, further expansion was checked by a revival of Ethiopian power under Emperor Menelik II which led to the defeat of Italian forces at the battle of Adua.  However, Italy was still able to secure the northern highlands in the Treaty of Wuchale, ending its conflict with Ethiopia until 1935.

Around the same time Italy began to colonize Somalia.  It avoided the other powers carving out domains in that area but gradually gained the southern Somali coast beginning with the Sultanate of Hobyo and the Sultanate of Majeerteen in 1888 and continuing with gradual acquisitions until 1925 when Chisimayu Region belonging to the British protectorate of Zanzibar was given to Italy.

The First World War (1914–1918)

Italy entered the First World War in 1915 with the aim of completing national unity: for this reason, the Italian intervention in the First World War is also considered the Fourth Italian War of Independence, in a historiographical perspective that identifies in the latter the conclusion of the unification of Italy, whose military actions began during the revolutions of 1848 with the First Italian War of Independence.

At the beginning of World War I Italy remained neutral, claiming that the Triple Alliance had only defensive purposes, and the war was started by the Austro-Hungarian Empire.  However, both the central empires and the Triple Entente tried to attract Italy on their side, and in April 1915 the Italian government agreed (London Pact) to declare war on the Austro-Hungarian Empire in exchange for several territories (Trentino-Alto Adige/Südtirol, Province of Trieste, Istria, Dalmatia).  In October 1917, the Austrians, having received German reinforcements, broke the Italian lines at Caporetto, but the Italians (helped by their allies) stopped their advance on the river Piave, not far from Venice.  After another year of trench warfare, and a successful Italian offensive in autumn 1918, the exhausted Austro-Hungarian Empire which was falling apart back home started to negotiate during the Battle of Vittorio Veneto. The Austrian-Italian Armistice of Villa Giusti was signed on November 3, 1918, but came in effect only a day later. As Austro-Hungarian troops had been prematurely told to stop fighting on the 3rd, the Italians could occupy Tyrol and capture over 300,000 Austro-Hungarians with hardly any resistance. The Treaty of Saint-Germain confirmed most of the London Pact.

The Fascist regime (1922–1943)

Under the post World War I settlement, Italy received most of the territories promised in the 1915 agreement, except for Dalmatia, which was mostly given to the newly formed Kingdom of Yugoslavia. Many Italian workers joined lengthy strikes to demand more rights and better working conditions. Some, inspired by the Russian Revolution, began taking over their factories, mills, farms and workplaces. The liberal establishment, fearing a socialist revolution, started to endorse the small National Fascist Party, led by Benito Mussolini, whose violent reaction to the strikes (by means of the "Blackshirts" party militia) was often compared to the relatively moderate reactions of the government. After several years of struggle, in October 1922 the fascists attempted a coup (the "Marcia su Roma", i.e. March on Rome); the fascist forces were largely inferior, but the king ordered the army not to intervene, formed an alliance with Mussolini, and convinced the liberal party to endorse a fascist-led government. Over the next few years, Mussolini (who became known as "Il Duce", the leader) eliminated all political parties (including the liberals) and curtailed personal liberties under the pretext of preventing revolution. The nation state could only be formed by means of revolt.

In 1929 Mussolini signed the Lateran Pacts with the Roman Catholic Church (with which Italy had been in conflict since the annexation of Rome in 1870), leading to the formation of the tiny independent state of Vatican City. He was initially on friendly terms with France and Britain, but the situation changed in 1935–36, when Italy invaded the Ethiopian Empire despite their opposition (Second Italo-Abyssinian War); because of this and of the ideological affinities with the Nazi party led by Hitler. It was a main part of the Axis Powers in World War II with allies being Imperial Japan and Nazi Germany as the Rome-Berlin-Tokyo Axis.

Interwar period
During the Spanish Civil War between the socialist Republicans and Nationalists led by Francisco Franco, Italy sent arms and over 60,000 troops to aid the Nationalist faction.

As Germany annexed Austria and moved against Czechoslovakia, Italy saw itself becoming a second-rate member of the Axis. The imminent birth of an Albanian royal child meanwhile threatened to give King Zog a lasting dynasty. After Hitler invaded Czechoslovakia (March 15, 1939) without notifying Mussolini in advance, the Italian dictator decided to proceed with his own annexation of Albania. Italy's King Victor Emmanuel III criticized the plan to take Albania as an unnecessary risk. On April 7, 1939, Italy invaded Albania; in a short campaign, the country was occupied and joined Italy in personal union.

Italy strengthened its ties with Germany on May 22, 1939, when both nations signed the Pact of Steel. This document solidified the alliance between the two regimes.

Italy and the Second World War (1940–1945)

At the beginning of World War II Italy remained neutral (with the consent of Hitler), but it declared war on France and Britain on June 10, 1940, when the French defeat was apparent. Mussolini believed that Britain would beg for peace, and wanted "some casualties in order to get a seat at the peace table", but that proved a huge miscalculation. With the exception of the navy, the Italian armed forces were a major disappointment for Mussolini and Hitler, and German help was constantly needed in Greece and North Africa.

Mussolini planned to concentrate Italian forces on a major offensive against the British Empire in Africa and the Middle East, known as the "parallel war", while expecting the collapse of the UK in the European theatre. The Italians invaded Egypt, British Somaliland and bombed Mandatory Palestine; the British government refused to accept proposals for a peace that would involve accepting Axis victories in Europe; plans for an invasion of the UK did not proceed and the war continued. Italy was defeated in East Africa; Italian advances in North Africa were successful, but the Italians stopped at Sidi Barrani waiting for logistic supplies to catch up. After the German army defeated Poland, Denmark, Norway, the Netherlands, Belgium, Luxembourg and France, Mussolini decided to use Albania as a springboard to invade Greece. The Italians launched their attack on October 28, 1940, and at a meeting of the two fascist dictators in Florence, Mussolini stunned Hitler with his announcement of the Italian invasion. Mussolini counted on a quick victory, but the Greek army halted the Italian one in its tracks and soon advanced into Albania. The Greeks took Korçë and Gjirokastër, and threatened to drive the Italians from the port city of Vlorë.

Albanian fear of renewed Greek designs on their country prevented effective co-operation with the Greek forces, and Mussolini's forces soon established a stable front in central Albania. Fearful that the Balkans might become the Achilles heel of her domination of Europe, on April 6, 1941, Germany intervened to crush both Greece and Yugoslavia, and a month later the Axis added Kosovo to Italian-ruled Albania. Thus Albanian nationalists ironically witnessed the realization of their dreams of uniting most of the Albanian-populated lands during the Axis occupation of their country. With the Axis invasion of Yugoslavia and the Balkans, Italy annexed Ljubljana, Dalmatia and Montenegro, and established the puppet states of Croatia and the Hellenic State.

After the invasion of the Soviet Union failed (1941–42), and the United States entered the war (December 1941), the situation for the Axis started to deteriorate. In May 1943 the Anglo-Americans completely defeated the Italians and the Germans in North Africa, and in July they landed in Sicily. King Victor Emmanuel III reacted by arresting Mussolini and appointing the army chief of staff, Marshal Badoglio, as Prime Minister.

The new government officially continued the war against the Allies, but started secret negotiations with them. Hitler did not trust Badoglio, and moved a large German force into Italy, on the pretext of fighting the Allied invasion. On September 8, 1943 the Badoglio government announced an armistice with the Allies, but did not declare war on Germany, leaving the army without instructions. Badoglio and the royal family fled to the Allied-controlled regions. In the ensuing confusion, most of the Italian army scattered (with some notable exceptions with the Decima MAS in La Spezia, around Rome and in places such as the Greek island of Cefalonia), and the Germans quickly occupied all of central and northern Italy (the south was already controlled by the Allies). The Germans also liberated Mussolini, who then formed the fascist Italian Social Republic, in the German-controlled areas. This led to the Italian Civil War.

During World War II, Italian war crimes included extrajudicial killings and ethnic cleansing by deportation of about 25,000 people, mainly Jews, Croats, and Slovenians, to the Italian concentration camps, such as Rab, Gonars, Monigo, Renicci di Anghiari and elsewhere.
In Italy and Yugoslavia, unlike in Germany, few war crimes were prosecuted. Yugoslav Partisans perpetrated their own crimes against the local ethnic Italian population (Istrian Italians and Dalmatian Italians) during and after the war, including the foibe massacres.

While the Allied troops slowly pushed the German resistance to the north (Rome was finally liberated in June 1944 – see Battle of Monte Cassino –, Milan in April 1945) the monarchic government finally declared war on Germany, and an anti-fascist popular resistance movement grew, harassing German forces before the Anglo-American forces drove them out in April 1945.

Aftermath
Much like Japan and Germany, the aftermath of World War II left Italy with a destroyed economy, a divided society, and anger against the monarchy for its endorsement of the Fascist regime for the previous twenty years. These frustrations contributed to a revival of the Italian republican movement. Following Victor Emmanuel III's abdication, his son, the new king Umberto II, was pressured by the threat of another civil war to call a Constitutional Referendum to decide whether Italy should remain a monarchy or become a republic. On 2 June 1946, the republican side won 54% of the vote and Italy officially became a republic. All male members of the House of Savoy were barred from entering Italy, a ban which was only repealed in 2002. 

Under the Treaty of Peace with Italy, 1947, Istria, Kvarner, most of the Julian March as well as the Dalmatian city of Zara was annexed by Yugoslavia causing the Istrian-Dalmatian exodus, which led to the emigration of between 230,000 and 350,000 local ethnic Italians (Istrian Italians and Dalmatian Italians), the others being ethnic Slovenians, ethnic Croatians, and ethnic Istro-Romanians, choosing to maintain Italian citizenship. Later, the Free Territory of Trieste was divided between the two states. Italy also lost all of its colonial possessions, formally ending the Italian Empire. The Italian border that applies today has existed since 1975, when Trieste was formally re-annexed to Italy.

See also
History of Italy as a Republic
House of Savoy (including the list of the modern kings of Italy)

Notes

Further reading
 Bosworth, Richard J. B. Mussolini's Italy (2005).
 Cannistraro, Philip V. ed. Historical Dictionary of Fascist Italy (1982)
 Clark, Martin. Modern Italy: 1871–1982 (1984, 3rd edn 2008)
 De Grand, Alexander. Giovanni Giolitti and Liberal Italy from the Challenge of Mass Politics to the Rise of Fascism, 1882–1922 (2001)
 De Grand, Alexander. Italian Fascism: Its Origins and Development (1989)
 Ginsborg, Paul. A History of Contemporary Italy, 1943–1988 (2003). excerpt and text search
 Lyttelton, Adrian. Liberal and Fascist Italy: 1900–1945 (Short Oxford History of Italy) (2002) excerpt and text search
 McCarthy, Patrick ed. Italy since 1945 (2000)
 Smith, D. Mack. Modern Italy: A Political History (1997) online edition, since 1860
 Toniolo, Gianni. An Economic History of Liberal Italy, 1850–1918 (1990)
 Vera Zamagni. The Economic History of Italy, 1860–1990 (1993) 413 pp. .

Modern history of Italy
Kingdom of Italy (1861–1946)
19th century in Italy
20th century in Italy
Italy in World War I
Italy in World War II

ja:イタリア王国
sr:Краљевина Италија